Nothing Like I Imagined (Except for Sometimes) is the third memoir by actress and comedy writer Mindy Kaling. Published in 2020, it is an essay collection made up of six stories, sold individually as Amazon Original Stories. Kaling reads the 2-hour, 19-minute audio version.

In this third installment of Kaling's memoirs, her new role as a single parent takes a central place, particularly as her own mother had died before Kaling's daughter was born. Reviewing the collection for The New York Times, Lauren Christensen emphasized Kaling's comedic approach to narrating potentially painful topics, using humor to approach dark topics for herself and which the reader might recognize in themselves too. Christensen wrote, "Kaling's voice is a comforting cure-all, an honest and optimistic antidote to all of life's woes."

References

External links
 Interview with Kaling on Morning Edition, October 6, 2020

2020 non-fiction books
Books by Mindy Kaling
American memoirs
Comedy books
American essay collections
Books about parenting